In topology, the closure of a subset  of points in a topological space consists of all points in  together with all limit points of . The notion of closure is in many ways dual to the notion of interior.

Definitions

Point of closure 

Another way to express this is to say that  is a point of closure of  if the distance  where  is the infimum. 

This definition generalizes to topological spaces by replacing "open ball" or "ball" with "neighbourhood". Note that this definition does not depend upon whether neighbourhoods are required to be open.

Limit point 

The definition of a point of closure of a set is closely related to the definition of a limit point of a set. A limit point of a set is also called cluster point or accumulation point of the set. 

Thus, every limit point is a point of closure, but not every point of closure is a limit point. A point of closure which is not a limit point is an isolated point.

Closure of a set

 is the set of all points of closure of 
 is the set  together with all of its limit points.
 is the intersection of all closed sets containing 
 is the smallest closed set containing 

The closure of a set has the following properties.

 The set  is closed if and only if .
 If  then  is a subset of 
 If  is a closed set, then  contains  if and only if  contains 

In a first-countable space (such as a metric space),  is the set of all limits of all convergent sequences of points in  For a general topological space, this statement remains true if one replaces "sequence" by "net" or "filter" (as described in the article on filters in topology).

Note that these properties are also satisfied if "closure", "superset", "intersection", "contains/containing", "smallest" and "closed" are replaced by "interior", "subset", "union", "contained in", "largest", and "open". For more on this matter, see closure operator below.

Examples
Consider a sphere in a 3 dimensional space. Implicitly there are two regions of interest created by this sphere; the sphere itself and its interior (which is called an open 3-ball). It is useful to distinguish between the interior and the surface of the sphere, so we distinguish between the open 3-ball (the interior of the sphere), and the closed 3-ball – the closure of the open 3-ball that is the open 3-ball plus the surface (the surface as the sphere itself).

In topological space:
 In any space, . In other words, the closure of the empty set  is  itself. 
 In any space  

Giving  and  the standard (metric) topology:
 If  is the Euclidean space  of real numbers, then .
 If  is the Euclidean space , then the closure of the set  of rational numbers is the whole space  We say that  is dense in 
 If  is the complex plane  then 
 If  is a finite subset of a Euclidean space  then  (For a general topological space, this property is equivalent to the T1 axiom.)

On the set of real numbers one can put other topologies rather than the standard one.
 If  is endowed with the lower limit topology, then 
 If one considers on  the discrete topology in which every set is closed (open), then 
 If one considers on  the trivial topology in which the only closed (open) sets are the empty set and  itself, then 

These examples show that the closure of a set depends upon the topology of the underlying space. The last two examples are special cases of the following.

 In any discrete space, since every set is closed (and also open), every set is equal to its closure.
 In any indiscrete space  since the only closed sets are the empty set and  itself, we have that the closure of the empty set is the empty set, and for every non-empty subset  of   In other words, every non-empty subset of an indiscrete space is dense.

The closure of a set also depends upon in which space we are taking the closure.

Closure operator

Given a topological space , the topological closure induces a function  that is defined by sending a subset  to  where the notation  or  may be used instead.

and also

Therefore, the abstract theory of closure operators and the Kuratowski closure axioms can be readily translated into the language of interior operators by replacing sets with their complements in 

In general, the closure operator does not commute with intersections. However, in a complete metric space the following result does hold:

Facts about closures

A subset  is closed in  if and only if  In particular:
 The closure of the empty set is the empty set;
 The closure of  itself is 
 The closure of an intersection of sets is always a subset of (but need not be equal to) the intersection of the closures of the sets. 
 In a union of finitely many sets, the closure of the union and the union of the closures are equal; the union of zero sets is the empty set, and so this statement contains the earlier statement about the closure of the empty set as a special case. 
 The closure of the union of infinitely many sets need not equal the union of the closures, but it is always a superset of the union of the closures.
 Thus, just as the union of two closed sets is closed, so too does closure distribute over binary unions: that is,  But just as a union of infinitely many closed sets is not necessarily closed, so too does closure not necessarily distribute over infinite unions: that is,  is possible when  is infinite.

It follows that  is a dense subset of  if and only if  is a subset of  

If  but  is not necessarily a subset of  then only 

The complement  is open in  where  being open in  now implies that  is also open in  Consequently  is a closed subset of  where  contains  as a subset (because if  is in  then ), which implies that  Intersecting both sides with  proves that  The reverse inclusion follows from  

 
because  for every  (where every  is endowed with the subspace topology induced on it by ). 
This equality is particularly useful when  is a manifold and the sets in the open cover  are domains of coordinate charts. 

Functions and closure

Continuity

A function  between topological spaces is continuous if and only if the preimage of every closed subset of the codomain is closed in the domain; explicitly, this means:  is closed in  whenever  is a closed subset of  

In terms of the closure operator,  is continuous if and only if  for every subset  

Similarly,  is continuous at a fixed given point  if and only if whenever  is close to a subset  then  is close to

Closed maps

A function  is a (strongly) closed map if and only if whenever  is a closed subset of  then  is a closed subset of  
In terms of the closure operator,  is a (strongly) closed map if and only if  for every subset  
Equivalently,  is a (strongly) closed map if and only if  for every closed subset

Categorical interpretation
One may define the closure operator in terms of universal arrows, as follows.

All properties of the closure can be derived from this definition and a few properties of the above categories. Moreover, this definition makes precise the analogy between the topological closure and other types of closures (for example algebraic closure), since all are examples of universal arrows.

See also
 
 
 Closed regular set, a set equal to the closure of their interior

Notes

References

Bibliography

External links

 

General topology
Closure operators